Carlie Irsay-Gordon is the vice chair and co-owner of the Indianapolis Colts. She led the team from 2014.

Biography 
Irsay-Gordon attended Skidmore College, where she studied religious studies and geoscience. She also rode competitively until the age of 20, on a horse named London Times. Irsay-Gordon attended Argosy University. She trained as a clinical psychologist but did not complete her boards. 

Irsay-Gordon first worked for the Colts in the ticket office and was subsequently involved in the marketing department and the strategies used by the sales team and ticket office.

Irsay-Gordon has represented the team at ownership meetings since 2004. In 2012, Irsay-Gordon and her sisters  Casey and Kalen became vice chairs and owners of the Colts. Irsay's father, Jim Irsay, has stated that he intends the team to entirely pass to his daughters. Irsay-Gordon was then named as chair of the Colts in March 2014 shortly after Jim Irsay was arrested and entered a rehabilitation facility for drug use. 

The Indianapolis Business Journal named her to their "Forty Under 40" list in 2015. In 2016, Irsay-Gordon joined the NFL Digital Media Committee as the only active female member of the committee.

Before the COVID-19 pandemic, Irsay-Gordon later recalled that she and Kalen Irsay-Jackson began to plan to focus the Colts' charitable attention on a single initiative, and selected a program on mental health, which became known as Kicking the Stigma. This launched in May 2021.

References 

Year of birth missing (living people)
Living people
Indianapolis Colts owners
Indianapolis Colts executives
Skidmore College alumni
Women sports owners